Associazione Sportiva Dilettantistica Lanciotto Campi Bisenzio or simply Lanciotto is an Italian association football club, based in Campi Bisenzio, Tuscany. It currently plays in Serie D.

History 
The club was founded on 23 June 2005 after the merger of A.C. Lanciotto (founded in 1944 and so named in memory of the local partisan Lanciottto Ballerini) and A.S. Campi Bisenzio (founded in 1969 as A.C. La Villa).

The team was promoted to Serie D in the 2010–11 season after an ascent started in Promozione in the 2009–10 season.

Colors and badge 
The team's color are red, yellow and blue.

Current season 
To see the scores of the current season click here.

References

External links 
Official Site

Football clubs in Tuscany
Association football clubs established in 2005
2005 establishments in Italy